State Route 301 (SR 301) is a north–south route located entirely in Calhoun County in east-central Alabama.

Route description

SR 301 is a former alignment of U.S. Route 431 (US 431) in the Oxford area. It begins at a junction with US 78 on the north side, and it ends at a junction with Interstate 20 (I-20) and US 431 at exit 191.

History
The SR 301 designation was established in February 2016 when US 431 was re-routed onto I-20 after the completion of the Anniston Eastern Bypass. US 431 followed a concurrency with US 78, but this short link road between the two U.S. Highways became known as SR 301.

Major intersections

See also

References

External links

301 
301 
U.S. Route 431
State highways in the United States shorter than one mile